Maria Andrea Virgilio (born 17 November 1996) is an Italian Paralympic archer. She won bronze in the Women's individual compound open at the 2020 Summer Paralympics in Tokyo.

She competed at the 2018 European Para Archery Championships, and 2019 European Para-Archery Cup.

She won the silver medal in her event at the 2022 World Para Archery Championships held in Dubai, United Arab Emirates.

References

External links
 Maria Andrea Virgilio at Olympics.com

Living people
1996 births
Archers at the 2020 Summer Paralympics
Medalists at the 2020 Summer Paralympics
Paralympic archers of Italy
Italian female archers
People from Bagno a Ripoli
Paralympic bronze medalists for Italy
Sportspeople from the Metropolitan City of Florence
21st-century Italian women